The 2017 Australian Production Car Series was an Australian motor racing competition for Group 3E Series Production Cars. 
It was sanctioned by the Confederation of Australian Motor Sport (CAMS) as an Authorised Series with Ontic Sports Pty Ltd appointed as the Category Manager.
It was the second Australian Production Car Series following the discontinuation of the Australian Production Car Championship at the end of 2015.

The series was won by Grant Sherrin & Iain Sherrin driving a BMW M4.

Schedule
The series was contested over five rounds:

Series standings

Classes
Class victories were awarded as follows:
 Class A1: Grant Sherrin & Iain Sherrin
 Class A2: Chris Lillis
 Class B1: Scott Gore
 Class B2: Troy Williams
 Class C:  Tyler Everingham
 Class D:  Ellexandra Best
 Class E:  Jason Walsh
 Class I:  Gerry Burges

Australian Production Car Cup
Outright victory in the Australian Production Car Cup was awarded to Grant Sherrin & Iain Sherrin.

References

Australian Production Car Championship
Production Car Series